The 2013 City of London Corporation election took place on 21 March 2013 to elect members of the Court of Common Council in the City of London Corporation, England. These elections take place every four years. As in the previous election, the vast majority of Council members were elected as independents. 

All 100 seats were won by independent candidates

Overall result

By-elections
In a subsequent by-election in the Portsoken ward in 2014 the Labour party won its first ever councillor in the Corporation: William Campbell-Taylor, an Anglican priest who had campaigned for higher ethical standards in the City.

References

2013
2013 English local elections